One Calvert Plaza, formerly the Continental Trust Company Building,  is a historic 16-story,  skyscraper in Baltimore, Maryland. The Beaux-Arts, early modern office building was constructed with steel structural members clad with terra cotta fireproofing and tile-arch floors. Its namesake was chartered in 1898 and instrumental in merging several Baltimore light and gas companies into one citywide system (known as the "Consolidated Gas, Light, Electric Power Company of Baltimore City" until 1955 when it was shortened and renamed the "Baltimore Gas and Electric Company"). When it was built in 1901, it was then the tallest building in Baltimore, and it kept that title until being surpassed by the iconic Bromo-Seltzer Tower of the Emerson Drug Company on the northeast corner of West Lombard and South Eutaw Streets on the downtown west side. Led by Capt. Isaac Edward Emerson, (1859–1931), the inventor of the stomach remedy and antacid, "Bromo-Seltzer" in 1911.

Continental Trust Company Building was listed on the National Register of Historic Places in 1983. It is within the Baltimore National Heritage Area.

References

External links
, including photo from 1984, at Maryland Historical Trust
Historical Marker Database

Downtown Baltimore
Office buildings completed in 1901
Baltimore National Heritage Area
Commercial buildings on the National Register of Historic Places in Baltimore
Skyscraper office buildings in Baltimore
Beaux-Arts architecture in Maryland